This is a list of flags used in Equatorial Guinea in Africa. For more information about the national flag, see flag of Equatorial Guinea.

National flag

Ethnic group flags

Municipality flags

Historical flags

See also 

 Flag of Equatorial Guinea
 Coat of arms of Equatorial Guinea

References 

Lists and galleries of flags
Flags